Back Again!!! is the second studio album by American singer Milira, released in 1992 under Motown Records. It peaked to number 81 on the Billboard Top R&B Albums chart and features the singles, "Three's a Crowd", and "One Man Woman".

Track listing

Charts

Singles

References

External links
myspace.com-mlrmilira

1992 albums
Milira albums
Motown albums